, also known as HTV-9 was the 9th flight of the H-II Transfer Vehicle, a robotic cargo spacecraft to resupply the International Space Station (ISS). It was launched on 20 May 2020, at 17:31:00 UTC.

Kounotori 9 is the last HTV of the original model, with following missions replaced with the HTV-X.

Spacecraft 
Major difference from the previous Kounotori are:
 Camera assembly unit and Wireless LAN communication unit (WLD), described below.

Wireless LAN Demonstration 
Wireless LAN Demonstration, or WLD (pronounced wild) is an experiment that will be performed during Kounotori 9's flight. During the test, a video taken by Kounotori 9 will be broadcast in real time on board the space station, via a wireless LAN (WLAN) datalink. The experiment will be conducting during Kounotori 9's approach, departure, and while berthed to the ISS. For WLD, the spacecraft has a camera attached to its propulsion module, while a data processor and WLAN antenna is located at the Unpressurized Logistics Carrier's aperture. The technology to be tested by WLD will enable ISS crews to monitor approaching vehicles during an autonomous docking. According to JAXA, if successful this will be the first time for two spacecraft to communicate using WLAN during a rendezvous.

Cargo 
Kounotori 9 carried about 6200 kg of cargo mass, consisting of 4300 kg in the pressurized compartment and 1900 kg in the unpressurized compartment. In addition to food items and crew commodities, the pressurized compartment (Pressurized Logistics Carrier; PLC)'s cargo consists of:

 JAXA cargo:
 Solid Combustion Experiment Module (SCEM)
 Integrated Standard Imager for Microsatellites (iSIM), a commercial technology demonstration payload by Satlantis
 Equipment for the space media business collaboration (Space Frontier Studio KIBO)
 Confocal Space Microscopy (COSMIC)

 NASA cargo:
 EXPRESS Rack 11B (ER11B)
 Tank for Water Storage System (WSS)
 High-pressure nitrogen tank for Nitrogen Oxygen Recharge System (NORS)

 ESA cargo:
 European Drawer Rack Mark II (EDR2)

Cargo in the unpressurized compartment (Unpressurized Logistics Carrier, ULC) was the Exposed Pallet (EP9) which carries the six lithium-ion batteries Orbital Replacement Units (ORUs) for replacing the ISS's existing nickel-hydrogen batteries. This was the last of the series of transportation of replacement batteries, following the previous Kounotori 6, Kounotori 7, and Kounotori 8.

On departure from ISS, Kounotori 9 was loaded with the Exposed Pallet of Kounotori 8 (EP8) carrying the replaced nickel-hydrogen batteries. It was left on ISS due to the missed extravehicular activity during the Kounotori 7 mission for the launch failure of Soyuz MS-10 in 2018. The Exposed Pallet of Kounotori 9 (EP9) was left on ISS, and subsequently, it was disposed of by jettisoning into orbit on 11 March 2021 using Space Station Remote Manipulator System (SSRMS), carrying old nickel-hydrogen batteries.

Operations

Launch 

Kounotori 9 was launched aboard the ninth and final launch of H-IIB rocket on 20 May 2020, at 17:31:00 UTC. The launch took place amid the COVID-19 pandemic, so that the usual launch viewing places were closed to spectators, and the local town offices requested not to visit for launch observation.

After the successful launch, the Kounotori 9 arrived to the proximity of the International Space Station on 25 May 2020, and it was captured by SSRMS at 12:13 UTC. It was mated to the Harmony's Common Berthing Mechanism (CBM). Berthing operation completed at 18:25 UTC.

Operation while berthed to ISS 
ISS crew opened the hatch of the Kounotori's PLC, and entered at 19:24 UTC. Cargo transfer of the pressurized cargo by the crew began on 26 May 2020.

Exposed Pallet (EP9), which carries lithium-ion batteries, was extracted from the ULC by the ground-operated SSRMS on 1 June 2020. Then, Kounotori 8's Exposed Pallet (EP8), carrying old nickel-hydrogen batteries, was stowed into the ULC on 02:48 UTC, 2 June 2020.

Departure and reentry to the Earth atmosphere 
On 18 August 2020, Kounotori 9 was detached from Harmony's CBM by the SSRMS, and it was released into orbit at 17:36 UTC. It was disposed by the destructive reentry to the Earth atmosphere at around 07:07 UTC, on 20 August 2020.

References

External links 
 HTV9 mission (JAXA)
 The Space Frontier Studio - KIBO
 Real-time orbital tracking - uphere.space

H-II Transfer Vehicles
2020 in Japan
Spacecraft launched in 2020
Spacecraft which reentered in 2020